Robert Ian "Bob" Moore  (born 1941), most commonly known as R. I. Moore, is a British historian who is Professor Emeritus of History at Newcastle University. He specialises in medieval history and has written several influential works on the subject of heresy. Moore was a pioneer in the UK of the teaching of world history to undergraduate students, has published numerous papers on comparative world history, and is series editor of the Blackwell History of the World.

Biography
Moore was born in Enniskillen, Northern Ireland, on 8 May 1941. He studied at Merton College, Oxford, from which he received a Bachelor of Arts degree in 1962 and a Master of Arts degree in 1966. From 1964 to 1994 he taught medieval history at the University of Sheffield, then moving to the Newcastle University, where he remained until 2003. He was a visiting professor at the University of Chicago in 1989 and the University of California at Berkeley in 2004.

Selected works

Books
 The Birth of Popular Heresy (1975)
 The Origins of European Dissent (1st 1977, revised 1985)
 The First European Revolution, c. 970–1215 (2000)
 Studies in Medieval History Presented to R. H. C. Davis, eds. Henry Mayr-Harting and Moore (Hambledon Press, 1985)
 The Formation of a Persecuting Society: Power and Deviance in Western Europe, 950–1250 (Blackwell Publishing, 1987); Expanded edition, The Formation of a Persecuting Society: Authority and Deviance in Western Europe, 950–1250 (Blackwell, 2007) 
 3rd. edition of R.H.C.Davis, A History of Medieval Europe: from Constantine to Saint Louis, (Pearson Longman, 2005) (1st ed. by Ralph Henry Carless Davis, Longman, 1957; 2nd ed. by Davis, 1970)
 The War on Heresy: the Battle for Faith and Power in Medieval Europe (Profile Books, 2012); US title, The War on Heresy (Harvard, 2012)

Historical atlas edited
    
 The Hamlyn Historical Atlas (London: Hamlyn, 1961; revised 1981): US title, Rand McNally Atlas of World History (Chicago: Rand McNally, 1981; revised 1983). Associate editors, Maps copyright Creative Cartography, Hamlyn, and Rand McNally.
 The Newnes Historical Atlas (Newnes Books, 1983)  
 Philip's Atlas of World History (George Philip and Son, 1992)

Papers
 Family, Community and Cult on the Eve of the Gregorian Reform', Transactions of the Royal Historical Society, 5th series, 30 (1980), 49–69.
 'Guibert of Nogent and his World,' in Studies in Medieval History Presented to R.H.C. Davis ed. Henry Mayr-Harting and R.I. Moore (London, 1985), 107-117.
 'Antisemitism and the Birth of Europe', Studies in Church History ed. Diana Wood, 29, Christianity and Judaism, (Oxford, 1992), 33 – 57.
 'Heresy and the Making of Literacy, c. 1000 – 1150', Peter Biller and Anne Hudson eds., Heresy and Literacy in the Middle Ages (Cambridge University Press, 1994), pp. 19 – 37, reprinted in Lester K. Little and Barbara H. Rosenwein eds., Debating the Middle Ages (Oxford 1998), pp. 363–75
 'Heresy, Repression and Social Change in the Age of Gregorian Reform', in Medieval Christendom and Its Discontents, ed. Scott J. Waugh (Cambridge University Press, 1996), pp. 19 – 46.
  'A la naissance d'une société persécutrice: les clercs, les Cathares et la formation de l'Europe', in Le Catharisme,: un ordre condamné: Centre nationale d'études cathares, 6e. session d'histoire médiévale, September 1993 (Carcassonne, 1996), pp. 11 – 37
 'Between Sanctity and Superstition: Saints and their Miracles in the Age of Revolution', in The Work of Jacques Le Goff, and the Challenges of Medieval History ed. Miri Rubin (Boydell Press, Woodbridge, 1997), pp. 63 – 75
 'World History' in Michael Bentley (ed.) Companion to Historiography (London, Routledge, 1997), pp. 941 – 59
 'The Birth of Europe as a Eurasian Phenomenon', Modern Asian Studies 31/3 (1997), pp. 583 – 601, reprinted in V. Lieberman, ed., Beyond Binary Histories: Re-imagining Eurasia to c. 1830 (Ann Arbor, 1999), pp. 139–59

Fellowships
 Royal Historical Society (1975)
 Royal Asiatic Society (1992) 
 Institute for Advanced Study, Indiana University (1995)
 Medieval Academy of America (2002)

References

External links
 
 

20th-century British historians
20th-century educators from Northern Ireland
20th-century writers from Northern Ireland
21st-century British historians
21st-century educators from Northern Ireland
21st-century writers from Northern Ireland
Academics of Newcastle University
Academics of the University of Sheffield
Alumni of Merton College, Oxford
British historians of religion
British medievalists
Corresponding Fellows of the Medieval Academy of America
Fellows of the Royal Historical Society
Historians from Northern Ireland
Historians of Christianity
Historians of Europe
Writers from Newcastle upon Tyne
1941 births
Living people